Iroquois is an unincorporated community in Wyoming County, West Virginia, United States.

The community was named after the Iroquois Indians.

References 

Unincorporated communities in West Virginia
Unincorporated communities in Wyoming County, West Virginia
Coal towns in West Virginia
Populated places on the Guyandotte River